is a Japanese alpine skier. She competed in slalom, giant slalom, and super-G at the 1998 Winter Olympics in Nagano.

References

External links
 Official JOC profile 

1978 births
Living people
People from Tokyo
Japanese female alpine skiers
Olympic alpine skiers of Japan
Alpine skiers at the 1998 Winter Olympics
Alpine skiers at the 2002 Winter Olympics